Meydan-e Bozorg (also Romanized as Meydān-e Bozorg) is a village in Jayedar Rural District, in the Central District of Pol-e Dokhtar County, Lorestan Province, Iran. At the 2006 census, its population was 618, in 134 families.

References 

Towns and villages in Pol-e Dokhtar County